Ngom can be:

A village in Nigeria
It is also spelt Ngum is a West African surname of the Serer people found in Senegal and the Gambia. 

Notable people with the surname Ngom include:
Dawda Ngum, Gambian footballer
Ousmane Ngom
Khady Yacine Ngom
Musa Ngum, Gambian singer and songwriter
Yusupha Ngum, Gambian singer and songwriter

Serer surnames